Thackery may refer to:

People
Bud Thackery (1903–1990), American cinematographer 
Carl Thackery (born 1962), British long-distance runner
Colin Thackery (born 1930), English Korean War veteran and singer 
Elizabeth Thackery (1767–1856), the first convict female to land in Australia
Jimmy Thackery (born 1953), American blues singer and guitarist

Fictional characters
Dr. John Thackery, in TV series The Knick
Thackery Binx, in the 1993 film Hocus Pocus 
Thackery Earwicket, the March Hare from the 2010 film Alice in Wonderland

Places
Thackery, a suburb of Matlock, Victoria, Australia
Thackery, Ohio, United States

See also

 Thackeray (disambiguation)
 William Makepeace Thackeray (1811–1863), British novelist, author and illustrator
 Thackray, a surname
 Thackrey, a surname
 The Thackery T. Lambshead Pocket Guide to Eccentric & Discredited Diseases, a 2003 anthology of fantasy medical conditions